Beccari's shrew (Crocidura beccarii) is a species of mammal in the family Soricidae. It is found in the Barisan Mountains of Sumatra.

Sources

Beccari's shrew
Mammals of Indonesia
Endemic fauna of Sumatra
Beccari's shrew
Taxonomy articles created by Polbot